Tajiks in Pakistan are residents of Pakistan who are of Tajik ancestry. The Tajiks are a Persian-speaking Iranian ethnic group native to Central Asia, living primarily in Afghanistan, Tajikistan, and Uzbekistan.

There are also Afghan Tajiks refugees in Pakistan. According to the Ministry of States and Frontier Regions in 2005, at least 7.3% of all Afghans living in Pakistan or roughly 221,000 individuals were categorised as ethnic Tajiks. There are also expatriates from Tajikistan.

History

During the ninth and tenth centuries, the western regions of Pakistan were part of the Samanid Empire, which was an Iranian dynasty of Tajik roots. The Samanid dynasty is also referred to as the "first Tajik state". The Ghurid dynasty and associated Tajik Vassal State of Swatis, called Gabri Pakhli, which existed between the ninth and 12th centuries, also ruled over parts of modern Pakistan.

Pakistan and Tajikistan are separated by a narrow strip of Afghan territory known as the Wakhan Corridor.

Demographics
	
The Gojal, Ishkoman and Yasin valleys of northern Pakistan's Gilgit-Baltistan region, as well as Chitral district, are home to a significant native population of Pamiri Tajiks, known as the Wakhis. They speak the Wakhi language, which is a distantly related dialect to Persian. The Wakhi Tajik Cultural Association represents and promotes Wakhi culture in Pakistan.

In addition, there were 221,725 Afghan Tajiks living in Pakistan in 2005, according to a census by the Ministry of States and Frontier Regions. They were amongst the massive influx of Afghan immigrants to Pakistan following the Soviet–Afghan War outbreak in 1979, while others arrived during the Afghan civil wars starting in 1992 and 1996 to escape the Taliban regime, or more recently, the post-2001 war in Afghanistan. Tajiks comprised 7.3% of the Afghan population in Pakistan, making them the second largest ethnicity after Pashtuns who formed 81.5% of immigrants. The census showed that they were divided into 42,480 families. In terms of sex ratio, 112,819 individuals (50.9%) were male and 108,906 (49.1%) were female.

Obtaining updated figures remains elusive as many Tajiks returned to Afghanistan or migrated abroad in the past several years, while some end up overstaying their visas or don't have valid documentation of their stay and travel when probed by law enforcement agencies.

In Balochistan, around 43,000 Afghan nationals living in the province as of 2005 were identified as Tajiks. Tajiks in Quetta worked mainly in clerical jobs and as teachers. They were wealthier in socioeconomic status compared to their Afghan counterparts of other ethnicities.

A small number of Tajiks also live in the Islamabad-Rawalpindi metropolitan region, and in Karachi in Sindh, where their population was up to 20,000 in 2004. Assimilating into Karachi's social and economic city life tends to be more challenging for Tajiks and other smaller communities than it is for Afghan Pashtuns, who are comparatively well-integrated.

During the 1990s, as a result of the Tajikistani Civil War, between 700 and 1,200 Tajikistanis arrived in Pakistan, mainly as students, the children of Tajikistani refugees in Afghanistan. In 2002, around 300 requested to return home and were repatriated back to Tajikistan with the help of the IOM, UNHCR and the two countries' authorities. As of 2009, there were around 140 Tajikistani students pursuing education at Pakistani universities.

Organisations
Tajikistan has an embassy in Islamabad, and honorary consulates in Karachi, Lahore and Peshawar. Airlines such as Tajik Air and Somon Air have expressed commercial interest in, and previously operated, flights linking Dushanbe to Pakistan in order to facilitate the movement of tourists and businesspeople between both countries. National festivities such as the Afghan Independence Day and Tajik Independence Day are observed by the Tajik diaspora.

Gallery

Notable people
 Abdul Sattar Afghani, two time Mayor of Karachi and a member of the National Assembly of Pakistan; of Afghan Tajik heritage.

See also

 Afghanistan–Pakistan relations
 Pakistan–Tajikistan relations

References

 
Afghan diaspora in Pakistan
Immigration to Pakistan
Pakistan–Tajikistan relations
Pakistan